Alien Gate is a video game developed by SPC Vision and published by Philips for the CD-i.

Gameplay
Alien Gate is a shooting game.

Reception

Next Generation reviewed the CD-i version of the game, rating it one star out of five, and stated that "Those who actually want shooting action from their CD-i will do better to stick with games like Mystic Midway than to delve into this painfully deficient travesty." Power Unlimited gave the game a score of 82% commenting: "Alien Gate is very difficult. You will have to practice for a long time, because if you don't know the levels by heart, you won't get very far. If you're a stickler this game will have a long shelf life."

Reviews
Joystick - Sep, 1993
The Video Game Critic

References

External links
 https://www.gamespot.com/alien-gate/

1993 video games
CD-i games
Fixed shooters
Video games developed in the Netherlands